Pegasys may refer to:
 A brand name of the medication peginterferon alfa-2a
 Pegasys, Inc., a Japanese software company that develops the TMPGEnc family of video encoding/editing programs
 Pegasus (disambiguation)